Methylnortestosterone may refer to:

 11β-Methyl-19-nortestosterone (11β-MNT)
 Methyldienolone (17α-methyl-19-nor-δ9-testosterone)
 Metribolone (methyltrienolone; R-1881; 17α-methyl-19-nor-δ9,11-testosterone)
 Normethandrone (methylestrenolone; normethisterone; 17α-methyl-19-nortestosterone)
 Trestolone (7α-methyl-19-nortestosterone; MENT)

See also
 Dimethylnortestosterone